No Lookin' Back is the second solo studio album by American musician Michael McDonald. It was released on 	July 30, 1985 by Warner Bros. Records, three years after his debut studio album, If That's What It Takes (1982); this was his last album to be released by Warner Bros. For the first time, he co-produced and wrote or co-wrote all of the tracks. It features contributions from guitarists Joe Walsh (Eagles, James Gang), Robben Ford and David Pack from Ambrosia, Jeff Porcaro on drums (Toto, Steely Dan), plus the former Doobie Brothers member Willie Weeks on bass, and Cornelius Bumpus providing horns.

On release, the album was received favorably by the majority of music critics and peaked at No. 45 on the US Billboard 200. Three singles were issued from No Lookin' Back: "No Lookin' Back", "Bad Times" and "Lost in the Parade". The album's first and leading single, "No Lookin' Back", was co-written by Kenny Loggins and was a commercial success, peaking at No. 4 on the Hot Mainstream Rock Tracks chart and No. 34 on Billboard Hot 100.

The album was re-released one year later in 1986. The re-released version changed around the track order and featured different album cover artwork, along with the inclusion of the hit single "Sweet Freedom" from the soundtrack of the Billy Crystal and Gregory Hines film Running Scared as well as a slightly shortened version of "Our Love".

Track listing

Personnel
Musicians
 Michael McDonald – lead and backing vocals (all tracks), keyboards (1), synthesizers (2-9), Hammond B3 organ (5, 7)
 Mike Hanna – synthesizers (2)
 Chuck Sabatino – synthesizers (3, 5), backing vocals (3, 5)
 Chris Pelonis – programming (3, 4, 7)
 Scott Plunkett – synthesizer horns (4), sequencing (7)
 Brian Mann – synthesizers (6, 8)
 Randy Goodrum – synthesizers (9)
 David Pack – guitar (1, 2, 4, 7), synthesizers (4), rhythm guitar (9)
 Joe Walsh – slide guitar (2)
 Robben Ford – guitar (3), lead guitar solo (9)
 Willie Weeks – bass (1, 3, 4, 5, 8, 9)
 Nathan East – bass (2)
 Jeff Porcaro – drums (1-5, 7, 8, 9), cymbals (6)
 George Perilli – drums (1), programming (4)
 Staff Fieldhouse – electronic drums (4, 8)
 Roger Nichols – drums (6)
 Paulinho da Costa – percussion (6, 9)
Cornelius Bumpus – tenor saxophone (3, 5)

Production
 Producers – Michael McDonald and Ted Templeman
 Production coordination – Joan Parker and Kathy Walker
 Engineer and Mixing – Ross Pallone
 Second engineer – Mike Wuellner
 Additional engineers – Lee Herschberg, Jim Pace and Grady Walker.
 Mixed at Hollywood Sound Recorders (Hollywood, CA).
 Originally mastered by Howie Weinberg at Masterdisk (New York, NY).
 CD mastering by Lee Herschberg at Amigo Studios (Los Angeles, CA).
 Art direction – Jeffrey Kent Ayeroff
 Design – Jeri McManus
 Front photography – Joel Levinson
 Back photography – Brian Aris

Sales chart performance
Album

Singles

See also
 List of albums released in 1985
 Michael McDonald's discography

References

External links
 

1985 albums
Michael McDonald (musician) albums
Albums produced by Ted Templeman
Warner Records albums